Pentium is a series of x86 architecture-compatible microprocessors produced by Intel. The original Pentium was first released on March 22, 1993.

Pentium-branded processors released from 2009 to 2022 are considered entry-level products that Intel rates as "two stars", meaning that they are above the low-end Atom and Celeron series, but below the faster Intel Core lineup and workstation/server Xeon series. These later Pentium processors have little more than their name in common with earlier Pentiums, which were Intel's flagship processor for over a decade until the introduction of the Intel Core line in 2006. They are based on both the architecture used in Atom and that of Core processors. In the case of Atom architectures, Pentiums are the highest performance implementations of the architecture. Pentium processors with Core architectures prior to 2017 were distinguished from the faster, higher-end i-series processors by lower clock rates and disabling some features, such as hyper-threading, virtualization and sometimes L3 cache.

The name "Pentium" is originally derived from the Greek word pente (πεντε), meaning "five", a reference to the prior numeric naming convention of Intel's 80x86 processors (8086–80486), with the Latin ending -ium since the processor would otherwise have been named 80586 using that convention.

In 2017, Intel split Pentium into two line-ups:
 Pentium Silver, aiming for low-power devices and shares architecture with Atom and Celeron. 
 Pentium Gold, aiming for entry-level desktop and using existing architecture, such as Kaby Lake or Coffee Lake.

In September 2022, Intel announced that the Pentium and Celeron brands will be replaced with the new "Intel Processor" branding for low-end processors in laptops from 2023 onwards.

Overview 

During development, Intel generally identifies processors with codenames, such as Prescott, Willamette, Coppermine, Katmai, Klamath, or Deschutes. These usually become widely known, even after the processors are given official names on launch.

The original Pentium-branded CPUs were expected to be named 586 or i586, to follow the naming convention of prior generations (286, i386, i486).  However, as the firm wanted to prevent their competitors from branding their processors with similar names (as AMD had done with their Am486), Intel filed a trademark application on the name in the United States, but was denied because a series of numbers was considered to lack trademark distinctiveness.

Following Intel's prior series of 8086, 80186, 80286, 80386, and 80486 microprocessors, the firm's first P5-based processor was released as the original Intel Pentium on March 22, 1993. Marketing firm Lexicon Branding was hired to coin a name for the new processor. The suffix -ium was chosen as it could connote a fundamental ingredient of a computer, like a chemical element, while the prefix pent- could refer to the fifth generation of x86.

Due to its success, the Pentium brand would continue through several generations of high-end processors. In 2006, the name briefly disappeared from Intel's technology roadmaps, only to re-emerge in 2007.

In 1998, Intel introduced the Celeron brand for low-priced processors. With the 2006 introduction of the Intel Core brand as the company's new flagship line of processors, the Pentium series was to be discontinued. However, due to a demand for mid-range dual-core processors, the Pentium brand was repurposed to be Intel's mid-range processor series, between the Celeron and Core series, continuing with the Pentium Dual-Core line.

In 2009, the "Dual-Core" suffix was dropped, and new x86 processors started carrying the plain Pentium name again.

In 2014, Intel released the Pentium 20th Anniversary Edition, to mark the 20th anniversary of the Pentium brand. These processors are unlocked and highly overclockable.

In 2017, Intel split the Pentium branding into two line-ups. Pentium Silver targets low-power devices and shares architecture with Atom and Celeron, while Pentium Gold targets entry-level desktops and uses existing architecture, such as Kaby Lake and Coffee Lake.

In September 2022, Intel announced that the Pentium and Celeron brands will be replaced with the new "Intel Processor" branding for low-end processors in laptops, starting in 2023.

Pentium-branded processors

P5 microarchitecture based 
The original Intel P5 or Pentium and Pentium MMX processors were the superscalar follow-on to the 80486 processor and were marketed from 1993 to 1999. Some versions of these were available as Pentium OverDrive that would fit into older CPU sockets.

Pentium

P6 microarchitecture based
In parallel with the P5 microarchitecture, Intel developed the P6 microarchitecture and started marketing it as the Pentium Pro for the high-end market in 1995. It introduced out-of-order execution and an integrated second-level cache on dual-chip processor package.
The second P6 generation replaced the original P5 with the Pentium II and rebranded the high-end version as Pentium II Xeon. It was followed by a third version named the Pentium III and Pentium III Xeon respectively. The Pentium II line added the MMX instructions that were also present in the Pentium MMX.

Versions of these processors for the laptop market were initially named Mobile Pentium II and Mobile Pentium III, later versions were named Pentium III-M. Starting with the Pentium II, the Celeron brand was used for low-end versions of most Pentium processors with a reduced feature set such as a smaller cache or missing power management features.

Pentium Pro

Pentium II

Pentium III

Netburst microarchitecture based
In 2000, Intel introduced a new microarchitecture named NetBurst, with a much longer pipeline enabling higher clock frequencies than the P6-based processors. Initially, these were named Pentium 4, and the high-end versions have since been named simply Xeon. As with Pentium III, there are both Mobile Pentium 4 and Pentium 4 M processors for the laptop market, with Pentium 4 M denoting the more power-efficient versions. Enthusiast versions of the Pentium 4 with the highest clock rates were named Pentium 4 Extreme Edition.

The Pentium D was the first multi-core Pentium, integrating two Pentium 4 chips in one package and was available as the enthusiast Pentium Extreme Edition.

Pentium 4

Pentium D

Pentium M microarchitecture based
In 2003, Intel introduced a new processor based on the P6 microarchitecture named Pentium M, which was much more power-efficient than the Mobile Pentium 4, Pentium 4 M, and Pentium III M. Dual-core versions of the Pentium M were developed under the code name Yonah and sold under the marketing names Core Duo and Pentium Dual-Core. Unlike Pentium D, it integrated both cores on one chip. From this point, the Intel Core brand name was used for the mainstream Intel processors, and the Pentium brand became a low-end version between Celeron and Core. All Pentium M based designs including Yonah are for the mobile market.

Pentium M

Pentium Dual-Core

Core microarchitecture based
The Pentium Dual-Core name continued to be used when the Yonah design was extended with 64-bit support, now named the Core microarchitecture. This eventually replaced all NetBurst-based processors across the four brands Celeron, Pentium, Core, and Xeon. Pentium Dual-Core processors based on the Core microarchitecture use the Allendale and Wolfdale-3M designs for desktop processors and Merom-2M for mobile processors.

Pentium Dual-Core

Pentium (2009)

In 2009, Intel changed the naming system for Pentium processors, renaming the Wolfdale-3M based processors to Pentium, without the Dual-Core name, and introduced new single- and dual-core processors based on Penryn under the Pentium name.

The Penryn core is the successor to the Merom core and Intel's 45 nm version of their mobile series of Pentium processors. The FSB frequency is increased from 667 MHz to 800 MHz, and the voltage is lowered. Intel released the first Penryn Core, the Pentium T4200, in December 2008. In June 2009, Intel released the first single-core processor to use the Pentium name, a Consumer Ultra-Low Voltage (CULV) Penryn core named Pentium SU2700.

In September 2009, Intel introduced the Pentium SU4000 series together with the Celeron SU2000 and Core 2 Duo SU7000 series, which are dual-core CULV processors based on Penryn-3M and using 800 MHz FSB. The Pentium SU4000 series has 2 MB L2 cache but is otherwise basically identical to the other two lines.

Nehalem microarchitecture based

The Nehalem microarchitecture was introduced in late 2008 as a successor to the Core microarchitecture, and in early 2010, a new Pentium G6950 processor based on the Clarkdale design was introduced based on the Westmere refresh of Nehalem, which were followed by the mobile P6xxx based on Arrandale a few months later.

On January 7, 2010, Intel launched a new Pentium model using the Clarkdale chip in parallel with other desktop and mobile CPUs based on their new Westmere microarchitecture. The first model in this series is the Pentium G6950. The Clarkdale chip is also used in the Core i3-5xx and Core i5-6xx series and features a 32 nm process (as it is based on the Westmere microarchitecture), integrated memory controller and 45 nm graphics controller and a third-level cache. In the Pentium series, some features of Clarkdale are disabled, including AES-NI, hyper-threading (versus Core i3), and the graphics controller in the Pentium runs at 533 MHz, while in the Core i3 i3-5xx series they run at 733 MHz, and Dual Video Decode that enables Blu-ray picture-in picture hardware acceleration, and support for Deep Color and xvYCC. The memory controller in the Pentium supports DDR3-1066 max, the same as the Core i3 i3-5xx series. The L3 cache is also 1 MB less than in the Core i3-5xx series.

Sandy Bridge microarchitecture based 
The Sandy Bridge microarchitecture was released in the Pentium line on May 22, 2011.

 aAll models share the following details: 2 cores, 2 logical processors (4 on Pentium 3xx with hyper-threading), CPUID signature 206A7, family 6 (06h), model 42 (02Ah), stepping 7 (07h)
 bTranslation lookaside buffer (TLB) and cache 64-byte prefetching; data TLB0 2-MB or 4-MB pages, 4-way associative, 32 entries; data TLB 4-KB pages, 4-way set associative, 64 entries; instruction TLB 4-KB pages, 4-way set associative, 128 entries, L2 TLB 1-MB, 4-way set associative, 64-byte line size; shared 2nd-level TLB 4 KB pages, 4-way set associative, 512 entries.
 cAll models feature: on-chip floating-point unit, Enhanced Intel SpeedStep Technology (EIST), Intel 64, XD bit (an NX bit implementation), Intel VT-x, Smart Cache.
 dAll models support: MMX, SSE, SSE2, SSE3, SSSE3, SSE4.1, SSE4.2
 eHD Graphics (Sandy Bridge) contain 6 EUs and HD Graphics 2000, but does not support these technologies: Intel Quick Sync Video, InTru 3D, Clear Video HD, Wireless Display, 3D Video, or 3D graphics acceleration.

Ivy Bridge microarchitecture based 
Currently, there exist Ivy Bridge models G2010, G2020, G2120, G2030, and G2130. All are dual-core and have no hyper-threading or Turbo Boost.

Haswell microarchitecture based 

Several Haswell-based Pentium processors were released in 2013, among them the G3258 "Anniversary Edition", first released in 2014 by Intel to commemorate the 20th anniversary of the line. As with prior-generation Pentium processors, Haswell and Haswell Refresh-based parts have two cores only, lack support for hyper-threading, and use the LGA1150 socket form factor.

Broadwell microarchitecture based 
Broadwell-based Pentiums were launched in Q1 2015 using a 14 nm process (e.g. the dual-core 1.9 GHz Intel Pentium 3805U with 2 MB cache). They used the FCBGA1168 socket.

Skylake microarchitecture based 
Skylake-based Pentium processors support up to 64 GB RAM. Features like Turbo Boost, Intel vPro, Hyper-Threading are not available. Supports AES-NI and RDRAND.

Integrated graphics are provided by Intel HD Graphics 510, utilizing a maximum of 1.7 GB of memory, for resolutions up to 4096×2304 @ 60 Hz using Display Port supporting up to 3 displays.

Kaby Lake microarchitecture based 
In Q1 2017 Intel released the Kaby Lake-based Pentium G4560; it is the first Pentium-branded CPU since the Netburst-based Pentium 4 to support hyper-threading, a feature available in some "Core"-branded products. Features include a clock speed of 3.5 GHz with four threads, 3 MB of L3 cache and Intel HD 610 integrated graphics.

Coffee Lake microarchitecture based 
All Coffee Lake Pentium processors support Hyper-threading, and integrated Intel UHD Graphics.

Comet Lake microarchitecture based 
All Comet Lake Pentium processors support Hyper-threading, and integrated Intel UHD 610 Graphics.

Pentium-compatible Intel processors
Due to its prominence, the term "Pentium-compatible" is often used to describe any x86 processor that supports the IA-32 instruction set and architecture. Even though they do not use the Pentium name, Intel also manufactures other processors based on the Pentium series for other markets. Most of these processors share the core design with one of the Pentium processor lines, usually differing in the amount of CPU cache, power efficiency or other features. The notable exception is the Atom line, which is an independent design.

 Celeron, a low-end version
 Core, the mainstream version including Core 2, Core i3, Core i5, Core i7 and Core i9, now placed above Pentium
 Xeon, a high-end version used in servers and workstations
 A100 (discontinued), an ultra-mobile version of Pentium M
 EP80579, a system-on-a-chip based on Pentium M
 Xeon Phi, a high-end version used in servers and workstations
 Intel Quark, a now-discontinued, low-power reimplementation of the Pentium architecture for use as microcontroller and in other embedded applications

See also
 List of Intel Pentium processors
 Intel Inside
 Pentium FDIV bug, a well-publicized flaw in the original processor
 Performance Rating, informally termed Pentium Rating
 "It's All About the Pentiums", a song by "Weird Al" Yankovic
 Athlon

References

Intel x86 microprocessors